Martha Jane "Marti" Peterson (née Denny; born May 27, 1945), now known as Martha Peterson Shogi, is a former operations officer of the United States Central Intelligence Agency (CIA) known for her role in the TRIGON mission.

Early life and education
Peterson was born Martha Jane Denny, on May 27, 1945, the daughter of Riley and Dorothy Denny. Although she was born in Kansas City, Missouri, she grew up in Darien, Connecticut, with her sister, Mary Alice. She graduated from Darien High School in 1963 and Drew University in 1967.

Career
Peterson joined the CIA in July 1973. After learning Russian, she was the first female officer sent to work in the Soviet Union in Moscow. From November 1975 on, her official job at the embassy was an administrative clerk in the consular department, dealing with visa and passport issues. In her covert role, she was responsible to keep contact via dead drops to Aleksandr Dmitrievich Ogorodnik, code named TRIGON, who was recruited earlier while working in South America. Ogorodnik was compromised and arrested by the KGB in summer 1977 and committed suicide during interrogation with a covert L-pill in his pen. Peterson, still not under suspicion of being an active CIA officer, was arrested a few weeks later while placing a dead drop for him. She was interrogated at the Lubyanka and expelled from the Soviet Union the next day. Peterson retired from the CIA in 2003. She wrote a book about some of her experience in the CIA, entitled, The Widow Spy.

Personal life 
Peterson met her first husband, John Peterson, during her first week of college. They married in 1969. Between 1967 and 1969, he served as Green Beret in Vietnam, and later became a CIA officer. He was killed during an assignment in Laos in a helicopter crash on October 19, 1972. On November 23, 1978, she married her second husband, State Department official Stephen Joseph Shogi. They have a son, Tyler, and a daughter, Lora. She subsequently married Thomas Dewi Rowlands (1939–2019), a Welsh-born aeronautical engineer, in 2011. The two met in the early 2000s, while they were both working for the charity Habitat for Humanity in Wilmington, North Carolina. Rowlands died on June 20, 2019, from age-related illnesses.

References

External links

1945 births
Living people
American spies
People of the Central Intelligence Agency
Cold War spies
Post–Cold War spies
People from Kansas City, Missouri
People from Darien, Connecticut
Drew University alumni
Darien High School alumni